Elkana Nyangau (born 1963) is a Kenyan sprinter. He competed in the men's 400 metres at the 1988 Summer Olympics.

References

1963 births
Living people
Athletes (track and field) at the 1988 Summer Olympics
Kenyan male sprinters
Olympic athletes of Kenya
Place of birth missing (living people)
African Games medalists in athletics (track and field)
African Games silver medalists for Kenya
Athletes (track and field) at the 1987 All-Africa Games